The 32nd Federation Cup qualifiers commenced from 14 September. Eight teams battled it out for a place in the quarterfinal round and had been divided into two groups.

The cup winner were guaranteed a place in the 2011 AFC Cup.

Qualifying play-offs 

The winner from each Zone qualified for the quarterfinal round which were held from 21 September.

|-
!colspan="3"|Zone A Round 1

|-
!colspan="3"|Final Play-off

|-
!colspan="3"|Zone B Round 1

|-
!colspan="3"|Final Play-off

Quarter-final league

The two qualifiers from the preliminary knock-out round joined the 14 I-League teams, who had been divided into four groups.

Group A

Group B

Group C

Group D

Semi-finals

|-
!colspan="3"|Semi-final 1

|-
!colspan="3"|Semi-final 2

Final

|-
!colspan="3"|The Final

Top scorers
Top scorers as of 29 September 2010.
5 goals

 Ranti Martins
 Muritala Ali

4 goals
 Tolgay Ozbey
3 goals
 Jose Ramirez Barreto
2 goals

 Odafe Onyeka Okolie
 C.S.Sabeeth
 Kailash Patil
 F.Lalmuanpuia
 Abdula Hamza
 Josimar da Silva Martins

1 goal

 Vijith Shetty
 Joaquim Abranches
 Malsawmfela
 Aibor Khongjee
 Robin Singh(footballer)
 Denson Devdas
 Chidi Edeh
 Paresh Shivalkar
 Reisang Pemme
 Peter Carvalho
 P.M.Lalhlimthara
 Boithang Haokip
 Jeje Lalpekhlua
 Ryuji Sueoka
 Luciano Sabrosa
 Ajay Singh
 Reisangmei Vashum

See also
2010–11 I-League

References

External links
 https://web.archive.org/web/20101003022902/http://kolkatafootball.com/federation_cup_2010/index.html

2010
2010–11 in Indian football
2010 domestic association football cups